Caladenia subtilis, commonly known as the delicate spider orchid, is a species of orchid endemic to New South Wales. It has a single leaf and a single greenish to cream-coloured flower with dark red tips on the sepals.

Description
Flowering occurs from October to November.

Taxonomy and naming
Caladenia subtilis was first described in 1999 by David Jones from a specimen collected in a state forest near Nowendoc and the description was published in The Orchadian. The specific epithet (subtilis) is a Latin word meaning "fine", "delicate" or "nice".

Distribution and habitat
The delicate spider orchid is only known from areas near Nowendoc and Nundle where it grows in open forest.

References

sanguinea
Endemic orchids of Australia
Orchids of New South Wales
Plants described in 1999
Taxa named by David L. Jones (botanist)